Wu Bo (1906 – 21 February 2005) was a Chinese politician who served as Minister of Finance between 1978 and 1980. He was a delegate to the 8th and 12th National Congress of the Chinese Communist Party, and a delegate to the 3rd National People's Congress. He was a member of the 5th Standing Committee of the Chinese People's Political Consultative Conference and a member of the 6th Standing Committee of the National People's Congress.

Biography
Wu was born in Jing County, Anhui, in 1906, during the late Qing dynasty. He joined the communist revolution in June 1939 and joined Chinese Communist Party in September 1941. During the Second Sino-Japanese War, he served in the Eighth Route Army in Shanxi-Chahar-Hebei Border Region and then Shaanxi-Gansu-Ningxia Border Region. During the Chinese Civil War, he worked in economic and financial section of Shanxi-Chahar-Hebei Border Region.

After the establishment of the Communist State in 1949, he was appointed vice minister of finance, vice president of the People's Bank of China, and deputy party secretary of Finance and Trade Commission of the State Council. In the ten-year Cultural Revolution, he suffered political persecution. In 1978, he was reinstated in the post of minister of finance, but having held the position for only two years. In June 1983, he became vice chairperson of the National People's Congress Financial and Economic Affairs Committee, serving in the post until his retirement in March 1988.

He died from an illness in Beijing, aged 99.

References

External links 
Biography of Wu Bo on the official website of the Ministry of Finance of the People's Republic of China 

1906 births
2005 deaths
Politicians from Xuancheng
Ministers of Finance of the People's Republic of China
People's Republic of China politicians from Anhui
Chinese Communist Party politicians from Anhui
Delegates to the 3rd National People's Congress
Members of the Standing Committee of the 6th National People's Congress
Members of the Standing Committee of the 5th Chinese People's Political Consultative Conference